Sibianor kenyaensis is a jumping spider species in the genus Sibianor that lives in Botswana and Kenya. The male was first described in 2001.

References

Salticidae
Spiders described in 2001
Spiders of Africa